Dęby may refer to the following places:
Dęby, Kuyavian-Pomeranian Voivodeship (north-central Poland)
Dęby, Lublin Voivodeship (east Poland)
Dęby, Pomeranian Voivodeship (north Poland)
Dęby, Masovian Voivodeship (east-central Poland)
Dęby, Lubusz Voivodeship (west Poland)
Dęby, Warmian-Masurian Voivodeship (north Poland)